The War in the North was the campaign of the Spanish Civil War in which the Nationalist forces defeated and occupied the parts of northern Spain that had remained loyal to the Republican government.

The campaign included several separate battles. The Biscay Campaign resulted in the loss of the part of the Basque Country still held by the Republic and Bilbao, the greatest Spanish industrial centre. That part of the campaign saw the Bombing of Guernica and Durango.   

The Battle of Santander caused the loss of the province of Santander in Cantabrian Castile for the Republic. The Battle of El Mazuco led to the capture of the Republican-controlled part of Asturias and the fall of Gijón, the Republic's last northern stronghold, to the Nationalists. The campaign ended on October 21, 1937 with a decisive and total Nationalist victory.

Background
On the Nationalist takeover of Navarre in July 1936, General Mola had announced a war of extermination and no mercy to any dissent. Harsh repression started to be implemented against those blacklisted, who were Navarrese individuals and their families, and by late August, the Requeté, a Carlist militia, from Navarre advanced towards Irun with a mission to cut off Gipuzkoa's Republican forces from the French border.
    
After the fall of Irun and then of San Sebastián, on September 23, 1936, the Nationalists, led by Francisco Franco, pushed their way through Gipuzkoa and cut off the Republican-controlled areas in northern Spain from the border with France. That area had been already isolated from the rest of Spain by Nationalist control at the beginning of the war. 

The area was very attractive to the Nationalists because of the industrial production of Biscay and the mineral resources of Asturias. The conquest and the control of the area would be profitable because of its valuable resources and would also expel Republican forces and concentrate large numbers of Nationalist troops to force a two-front war. Franco realised that Madrid, the capital, was not going to be conquered quickly but that Basque resources of iron, coal, steel and chemicals were a tempting target. The northern Republicans were also politically divided and weakened by struggles between Basque nationalists and leftists. Furthermore, its major supplies came by sea. Franco ordered his commanders on the Madrid front to go on the defensive and to send all available resources to the north.

Republican forces attempted to establish a front at Buruntza. Eventually, the front stabilised temporarily on the western fringes of Gipuzkoa (Intxorta) in October 1936, when the Basque Statute of Autonomy was passed in Madrid, and the Basque government was rapidly organised. As military rebels advanced, tens of thousands of panicking civilians from the occupied areas fled towards Bilbao.

Beginning

Emilio Mola was in command of the start of this campaign on March 31, 1937, but he died in an airplane crash on June 3, 1937. The Nationalists began the attack with 50,000 men of the 61st Solchaga. The Republican Army of the North was commanded by General Francisco Llano de la Encomienda, which was the beginning of the Biscay Campaign.
The Nationalist offensive started on March 31, and the same day, the Legión Condor bombed the town of Durango, with 250 civilian deaths. The Navarrese troops attacked the town of Ochandiano, and on April 4, occupied it only after heavy combat. Mola then decided to stop the advance because of bad weather.
 
On April 6, the Nationalist government in Burgos announced the blockade of the Basque ports, but some British ships entered Bilbao. On April 20, the Nationalists continued their offensive and occupied Elgeta after a heavy artillery bombardment. The same day, the Legion Condor bombed Guernica. The Basques retreated to the Iron Belt line, and on April 30, the Italians occupied Bermeo, but the Nationalist battleship España was sunk by a mine.

The Republican government decided to send 50 aircraft to Bilbao, and it launched two offensives against Huesca and Segovia to stop the Nationalist advance, but both failed. On June 3, Mola was replaced by Davila. On June 12, the Nationalists started their assault of the Iron Belt and, after heavy aerial and artillery bombings, entered Bilbao on June 19.

Battle of Santander

After the fall of Bilbao, the Republican government decided to launch an offensive against Brunete to stop the Nationalist offensive in the north on July 6, but by July 25, the offensive had ended. The Republican troops in Cantabria had low morale, and the Basque soldiers did not want to stop fighting. On August 14, the Nationalists launched their offensive against Cantabria, with the 90,000 men, 25,000 of whom were Italian, and 200 aircraft of the Army of the North. On August 17, the Italians occupied the El Escudo Pass and encircled 22 Republican battalions at Campoo, Cantabria. On August 24, the Basque troops surrendered to the Italians at Santoña, and the Republican troops fled from Santander. On August 26, the Italians occupied Santander, and by September 1, the Nationalists had occupied almost all of Cantabria. The Nationalists captured 60,000 prisoners, the greatest number during the war.

Asturias Campaign

After the failed republican offensive against Zaragoza, the Nationalists decided to continue their offensive against Asturias. The Nationalists had overwhelming numerical (90,000 men against 45,000) and material (more than 200 aircraft against 35) superiority, but the Republican Army in Asturias was better organised than in Santander, and the difficult terrain provided excellent defensive positions. During the Battle of El Mazuco, 30,000 Navarrese troops, led by Solchaga and supported by the Legion Condor, eventually took the El Mazuco valley and the critical nearby mountains (Peña Blanca and Pico Turbina), which were held by 5,000 Republican soldiers only after 33 days of bloody combat.

On October 14, the Nationalists broke the Republican front, and on October 17, the Republican government ordered the evacuation of Asturias to begin. However, Nationalist ships were blockading the Asturian ports, and only a few military commanders (Adolfo Prada, Galan, Belarmino Tomas) managed to escape. By October 21, the Nationalists had occupied Gijón and completed the conquest of the northern zone.

Aftermath
With the conquest of the North, the Nationalists controlled 36% of Spanish industrial production, 60% of the coal production and all of the steel production. Furthermore, more than 100,000 Republican prisoners were forced to join the Nationalist Army or were sent to labour battalions. The Republic had lost the Army of the North (more than 200,000 soldiers), and by then, a complete military victory of the Republic in the war became impossible. Franco then decided to start a new offensive against Madrid, but Vicente Rojo Lluch, the leader of the Republican Army, launched a diversionary offensive in Aragon, the Battle of Teruel.

See also 

 List of Spanish Nationalist military equipment of the Spanish Civil War
 Condor Legion
 List of weapons of the Corpo Truppe Volontarie
 List of Spanish Republican military equipment of the Spanish Civil War

References

Bibliography
 
Graham, Helen. (2005). The Spanish Civil War. A Very Short introduction. Oxford University Press. .
Jackson, Gabriel. (1967) The Spanish Republic and the Civil War, 1931–1939. Princeton University Press. Princeton. .

External links
Juan Antonio de Blas, El Mazuco (La defensa imposible), in La guerra civil en Asturias, Ediciones Júcar, Gijón 1986 (pp369–383).
 El Mazuco (the impossible defence) Translated from the Spanish  
  La Guerra Civil en Cantabria
  Almirante Cervera log

Battles of the Spanish Civil War
Conflicts in 1937
1937 in Spain
Basque history